Pierre Dubuc (born Jean-Pierre Dubuc May 25, 1947 in Montreal, Quebec) is the director and editor of L'aut'journal, a progressive monthly paper. He is one of the founders of SPQ Libre, a left-wing political club within the Parti Québécois.

Biography 
Pierre Dubuc completed studies in political science at the Université de Montréal. He eventually became active within the Marxist-Leninist movement En lutte!. He departed the group later in the 1970s, finding it not enough to the left, to join the Union bolchévique. Dubuc founded in 1984, the monthly paper called L'aut'journal, of which he is now director and editor. In 1996, he contributed to the creation of the Chaire d'études socio-économiques de l'UQÀM, which he directed for two years.

He joined the Parti Québécois in 2004 when the pro-union, progressive SPQ Libre was founded, with his assistance. He declared on July 20, 2005 his intention to enter the Parti Québécois leadership election of 2005 in the name of the SPQ Libre. His candidacy was approved unanimously by the SPQ Libre on August 15, 2005, and confirmed by the Parti Québécois on September 9, 2005. He won 1,282 votes or 1.2% of the ballots cast.

Bibliography 
 L'autre histoire de l’indépendance, Éditions Trois-Pistoles, 2003.
 Manifeste du SPQ Libre, Éditions Trois-Pistoles, 2005. 
 Larose n’est pas Larousse, Éditions Trois-Pistoles, 2003, with Charles Castonguay, Jean-Claude Germain et Victor-Lévy Beaulieu.

See also 
 L'aut'journal
 SPQ Libre
 Quebec sovereignty movement
 Parti Québécois
 2005 Parti Québécois leadership election

External links 
 Leadership election campaign website
 L'aut'journal website
 SPQ Libre website

Political consultants from Quebec
Writers from Montreal
Living people
1947 births
Université de Montréal alumni
Parti Québécois politicians
Activists from Montreal